The Misiones Orientales or Sete Povos das Missões/Siete Pueblos de las Misiones is a historic region in South America, in present-day Rio Grande do Sul, the southernmost State of Brazil.

Together with present-day Misiones Province in Argentina and the old Misiones Department in Paraguay (later subdivided into Misiones and Itapúa) it formed the Jesuit Reductions between 1609 and 1756, an almost fully independent territory created and ruled by the Spanish Catholic order of the Jesuits. It was famous for its resistance to enslavement and its egalitarian laws based on the Bible. The seven missions were called San Miguel, Santos Ángeles, San Lorenzo Mártir, San Nicolás, San Juan Bautista, San Luis Gonzaga, and San Francisco de Borja.

The King of Spain was the nominal ruler of these lands and in the Treaty of Madrid (1750) he gave the eastern part of the Jesuit Reductions to Portugal. The seven Jesuit missions here  were to be dismantled and relocated on the Spanish western side of the Uruguay River. The Guarani people living there refused, which led to the Guarani War, won by Portugal and Spain.

The territory returned to Spain in 1777 in the First Treaty of San Ildefonso, but was definitively ceded to Portugal in the Treaty of Badajoz (1801). It became part of Brazil when this country gained its independence from Portugal in 1822.

See also

 
 
 List of Jesuit sites
 Sculpture of the Misiones Orientales

Jesuit Missions of the Guaranis
Colonial Argentina
Colonial Brazil
Jesuit history in South America
Spanish missions in Argentina
Spanish missions in Brazil
Geography of Misiones Province
Geography of Rio Grande do Sul
Misiones Department
Former subdivisions of Brazil
17th century in Brazil
18th century in Brazil
17th century in the Viceroyalty of Peru
18th century in the Viceroyalty of Peru